Senator Shultz may refer to:

Clark Shultz (fl. 1990s–2010s), Kansas State Senate
Reynolds Shultz (1921–2000), Kansas State Senate
Searles G. Shultz (1897–1975), New York State Senate
John Andrew Shulze (1775–1852), Pennsylvania State Senate